Significant Others is an American drama television series that aired on the Fox Network from March 11 to April 15, 1998. The series was created and executive produced by Christopher Keyser and Amy Lippman.

Summary
The series centered on Henry Callaway, Cambell Chasen, and Nell Glennon, three twenty-something friends living in Los Angeles. Other stars included Michael Weatherly, Elizabeth Mitchell, Gigi Rice, and Richard Masur.

Only five episodes were shown before cancellation, although six episodes were produced.

Cast
 Scott Bairstow as Henry Callway
 Eion Bailey as Cambell Chasen
 Jennifer Garner as Nell Glennon
 Michael Weatherly as Ben Chasen
 Elizabeth Mitchell as Jane Merril-Chasen
 Richard Masur as Leonard Chasen
 Gigi Rice as Charlotte

Episodes

DVD release
Sony Pictures Home Entertainment released the entire series, including the unaired episode,  on DVD in Region 1 in 2004 after Jennifer Garner had gained fame on the TV series Alias.

References

External links
 
 

1998 American television series debuts
1998 American television series endings
1990s American drama television series
English-language television shows
Fox Broadcasting Company original programming
Serial drama television series
Television shows set in Los Angeles
Television series by Sony Pictures Television